A sandwich bar is a restaurant or take-away food shop that primarily sells sandwiches. Some sandwich bars also offer other types of fare, such as soups, grilled foods. and meals. Notable sandwich bars include Subway and Arby's.

The term can also refer to a self-service area with foods for preparing sandwiches.

See also
 Diner

References

Further reading
 
 'Give Us More Music': Women, Musical Culture, and Work in Wartime Britain ... – David Allen Sheridan – Google Boeken. pp. 97-100.

External links
 

 
Restaurants by type